The 2020–21 PGA Tour Champions season is the 41st in which PGA Tour Champions, a golf tour for men age 50 and over, has operated. The tour officially began in 1980 as the Senior PGA Tour.

The season was severely impacted by the COVID-19 pandemic, with half the scheduled tournaments being cancelled, including four of the five senior majors. As a result the only major played in 2020 was the Senior Players Championship, which was won by Jerry Kelly, who finished two strokes ahead Scott Parel to claim his first senior major title. The season was expanded to include all 2021 tournaments with the Charles Schwab Cup Playoffs events in 2020 returning to regular event status.

Tournament results
The following table shows the official schedule of events for the 2020–21 season.

Leaders
Scoring average leaders

Source:

Money List leaders

Source:

Career Money List leaders

Source:

Awards

See also
PGA Tour Champions awards
PGA Tour Champions records
2020 European Senior Tour
2021 European Senior Tour

References

PGA Tour Champions seasons
PGA Tour Champions
PGA Tour Champions
PGA Tour Champions season